Berömda män som varit i Sunne (lit. Famous Men Who Have Visited Sunne) is a 1998 novel by Swedish author Göran Tunström about Sunne. It won the August Prize in 1998.

References

1998 Swedish novels
Swedish-language novels
August Prize-winning works
Novels set in Värmland
Albert Bonniers Förlag books